Lumuyu Petroglyphs or also called as Lumuyu Rock Carvings comprising several petroglyphs situated not far from the Bekuku Village in Ulu Tomani of Tenom District in Sabah, Malaysia.

History 
The first rock carving in Ulu Tomani were discovered by local villagers in 1971. According to local folklore, the carvings were made by six brothers to release their grief at the loss of their youngest brother who was murdered. These carvings are believed to have been crafted 1,000 years ago. The area have been declared as Cultural Heritage under the Cultural Heritage Enactment (Conservation) 1997.

Following the redocumentation of the Lumuyu Petroglyph site in Ulu Tomani in 2012, this led to a new finding for exploration by the following years. In 2013, a group of archaeologists led by Baszley Bee assisted by Master students and final year history students of the School of Social Sciences (SSS) including staff from the Archaeology Department of the National Heritage Department and Archaeology Division of the Sabah Museum found four new petroglyph sites at Ulu Tomani including in other area in Long Pasia.

References 

Archaeological sites in Malaysia
Tenom District
Visual arts media
Petroglyphs
Rock art in Asia
Prehistoric art
Tourist attractions in Sabah
Museums in Sabah